John James Charles (May 9, 1944 – June 16, 2019) was an American football cornerback and safety who played eight seasons in the National Football League (NFL). He played college football at Purdue University where he was an All-American in 1966 and the Rose Bowl MVP in leading the Boilermakers over USC on January 2. Charles prepped at Linden High School in Linden, New Jersey. He was inducted into the Purdue Intercollegiate Athletic Hall of Fame on April 18, 2015.

Charles was a first round selection in the 1967 NFL/AFL Draft, taken by the Boston Patriots. In early October 1970, he was sent to Minnesota as compensation after Boston signed quarterback Joe Kapp. He played for the Houston Oilers from 1971 through 1974.

Charles died in Houston at age 76 in 2019.

References

External links
 

1944 births
2019 deaths
Linden High School (New Jersey) alumni
People from Linden, New Jersey
Sportspeople from Union County, New Jersey
American football defensive backs
Purdue Boilermakers football players
Boston Patriots players
Minnesota Vikings players
Houston Oilers players
Players of American football from Newark, New Jersey
American Football League players